Orest V. Maresca (May 27, 1914 – October 6, 2000) was an American politician who served in the New York State Assembly from 1951 to 1968.

References

1914 births
2000 deaths
Democratic Party members of the New York State Assembly
20th-century American politicians